Wanyan Yungong (完顏允恭; 1146－1185), personal name Hutuwa (胡土瓦), was an imperial prince of the Jurchen-led Jin Dynasty. He was the son of  Emperor Shizong of Jin an Empress Mingde. He was the father of Emperor Zhangzong of Jin and Emperor Xuanzong of Jin.

In April of the second year of reign Emperor Shizong (May 1162), became the Crown Prince .In the first month of the eighth year of Emperor Shizong, his title was changed back. In June of the 25th year of Shizong, the prince died of illness in Chenghua Hall. After hearing the news, Shizong was very sad and gave the  posthumous Prince Xuanxiao.

After  his eldest son became emperor, he was awarded with the temple name of Xianzong (顯宗).

Family 
Parents

 Father: Emperor Shizong of Jin
 Mother: Lady Wulinda (烏林荅氏), posthumously honoured as Empress Mingde (明德皇后)

Wives

 Empress Xiaoyi (孝懿皇后; 1147–1191) of the Tudan clan (徒單氏)
 Emperor Zhangzong of Jin (31 August 1168 – 29 December 1208), personal name Madage(麻達葛),sinicized name Wanyan Jing  (完顏璟)
 Empress Zhaosheng, of the Liu clan (昭聖皇后劉氏)
 Emperor Xuanzong of Jin (18 April 1163 – 14 January 1224), personal name Wudubu,(吾睹補), sinicized names Wanyan Xun (完顏珣)
 Lady Tian (田氏)
 Chengqing(承慶), sinicized name Wanyan Cong(完顏琮), Prince Huizhuang of Yun (鄆莊惠王)
 Huandu'(桓篤), sinicized name Wanyan Gui' (顏瑰), Prince Wenjing of Ying (瀛文敬王)
 Wulibu (吾里不),sinicized name Wanyan Zan', Prince of Huo (霍王完顏瓚)
 Lady Wang (王氏)
 Moulianghu (謀良),sinicized name Wanyan Jie (完顏玠), Prince Mindao of Wen (溫悼敏王)
 Unknown: 
 Princess Zhangguo of  Ye (邺国长公主), married Wugulun Yi (乌古论谊)
 Princess Guo of Yi (沂国公主)
 Princess Zhangguo of Xing (邢国长公主), married Pusan Kui (仆散揆) of the Pusan clan (仆散氏)
 Princess Zhangguo of Sheng (升国长公主), married Pucha Cibu of the Pucha clan (蒲察辞不失)
 Princess Jingguo (景国公主), married Pucha Cibu of the Pucha clan (蒲察辞不失)
 Princess Daoguo (道国公主), married Pucha Cibu of the Pucha clan (蒲察辞不失)

References 

1146 births
1185 deaths